Hedy Frank-Autheried (22 January 1902 – 24 March 1979) was an Austrian composer. She studied music at the Vienna Academy, but was unable to further her education at that time. She married Ferdinand Frank and later studied composition with Camillo Horn. After completing her studies, she worked as a composer. She died in Vienna.

References

1902 births
1979 deaths
20th-century classical composers
Women classical composers
Austrian classical composers
Academy of Fine Arts Vienna alumni
20th-century women composers